Gwandu, also called Gando, is a town and emirate in Kebbi State, Nigeria. The seat of government for the emirate and district of this name is in Birnin Kebbi, which is the capital of Kebbi State and was capital of the historical Kingdom of Kebbi. Founded in the sixteenth century by the Kabbawa, a Hausa-speaking people, Gwandu today acts as one of the four emirates composing Kebbi State.

The town became important during the Fulani jihad, and from 1815 it was one of the two capitals of the Fulani empire until it came under British control in 1903.

References

Local Government Areas in Kebbi State
Populated places established in the 16th century
Populated places